I slik en natt (On a Night Like This) is a Norwegian war film from 1958 directed by Sigval Maartmann-Moe. It stars Anne-Lise Tangstad. The music was composed by Øivin Fjeldstad.

The title I slik en natt is taken from Henrik Wergeland's poem "Juleaftenen" (Christmas Eve) in his poetry collection Jøden (The Jew), and the film deals with the Gestapo's search for a group of Jewish children in Oslo and bold action to bring the children to safety.

Plot

In the film
In November 1942 in occupied Norway, a group of Jewish refugee children are in danger, and a young doctor tries to save them from the Germans. They engage in a dramatic escape to Sweden.

Historical event
Colbjørn Helander's film script is based on an actual event, although it is not a documentary. In the fall of 1942, the Nazis had begun sending Norwegian Jews to concentration camps in Germany. The film shows German soldiers carrying out the arrests of the Jews, but in reality, only Norwegians did it. Several people helped with the escape, but the film combines them in the character of the young female doctor. Two Norwegian women gathered the orphaned Jewish children at an orphanage in Oslo. However, they were also not safe there. Just minutes before the Gestapo arrived, the children had been moved. The real rescue operation was led by the German-Russian child psychologist Nina Hasvoll and the Norwegian Sigrid Helliesen Lund when the children at the Jewish orphanage in Oslo were smuggled into Sweden in the fall of 1942, thus escaping the Holocaust. Filmmaker Nina Grünfeld's documentary film Ninas barn is about this rescue operation.

Cast
The young doctor is played by Anne-Lise Tangstad. Two other important roles are played by Lalla Carlsen as Maren the housekeeper and Joachim Holst-Jensen as a composer and the young doctor's uncle. Together they manage to keep the young refugees hidden for a few nerve-wracking weeks before they can be sent across the border to Sweden and safety. Something that helped give the film more realism were the two Germans that portrayed SS officers. The director, Sigval Maartmann-Moe, had himself experienced SS men at uncomfortably close range, and he believed that Germans were needed to portray this type. He was able to "borrow" Günther Hüttmann and Ottakar Panning from the German theater and, according to Maartmann-Moe, this German–Norwegian collaboration worked perfectly.

 Lalla Carlsen as Maren
 Joachim Holst-Jensen as Goggen
 Anne-Lise Tangstad as Liv Kraft
 Freddie Aronzon as a child refugee
 Yvonne Aronzon as a child refugee
 Hilde Brenni as the home front contact
 Per Christensen as a railway employee
 André Deloya as a child refugee
 Nili Deloya as a child refugee
 Victor Deloya as Lehmann, a doctor
 Stig Egede-Nissen as the janitor
 Knut M. Hansson as an SS officer
 Günther Hüttmann as von Feldhofen, an SS adjutant
 Øivind Johnssen as the driver's brother
 Willy Kramer-Johansen as a doctor
 Anne-Rita Leimann as a child refugee
 Leonard Levin as a child refugee
 Erling Lindahl as the interrogator
 Jon Lennart Mjøen as an SS officer
 Arve Opsahl as a policeman
 Edith Ottosen as an informer
 Ingrid Øvre as a nurse
 Ottokar Panning as Kranz
 Thorleif Reiss as the chief physician
 Georg Richter as an SS officer
 Arne Riis as a man at the border
 Harry Rødner as a child refugee
 Jan Rødner as a child refugee
 Ethel-Liv Selikowitz as a child refugee
 Harry Sam Selikowitz as a child refugee
 Rolf Søder as a driver
 Tor Stokke as a policeman
 Stevelin Urdahl as an SS officer
 Aasta Voss

References

External links
 
 I slik en natt at the National Library of Norway
 I slik en natt at Filmfront

1958 films
Norwegian war drama films
Norwegian World War II films
Norwegian black-and-white films
1950s Norwegian-language films